N. Sankaraiah (born 15 July 1921) is an Indian Communist Party politician and independence activist.

After passing Matriculation, Sankaraiah started studying History from American College, Madurai in 1937. He was one of the founders of Madras Students organization and was elected Secretary of Madurai Students Union. During this time he started participating in the freedom struggle of India. He was first arrested in 1941 when he was a final year student of the American college, Madurai. His long political career spanning over seven decades included nearly eight years in jail. Sankaraiah, who was one among the many communists who were released just a day before India attained Independence in August 1947, campaigned for communist candidates in the first general elections. He was one of the 32 National Council members who walked out from a Communist Party of India National Council meeting held on 11 April 1964, in protest, accusing Party Chairman S.A. Dange and his followers of "anti-unity and anti-Communist policies".

Later he became one of the founder members of the Communist Party of India (Marxist). He was the central committee member of Communist Party of India (Marxist). He was part of the leadership of All India Kisan Sabha. He was the CPI(M) Tamil Nadu State Secretary from 1996 to 2001.

He was elected to Tamil Nadu legislative assembly twice from the Madurai West constituency in 1967 and from Madurai East constituency in 1977 and 1980. He unsuccessfully contested the 1962 and 1957 elections from Madurai East constituency.

His two sons, Chandrasekar and Narasimman, are party leaders. He was married to Navamani. He turned 100 in July 2021.

References

External links 

1977 Tamil Nadu Election Results, Election Commission of India
1980 Tamil Nadu Election Results, Election Commission of India
Dinamani Article about Sankaraiah

1921 births
Living people
20th-century Indian politicians
Communist Party of India (Marxist) politicians from Tamil Nadu
Indian centenarians
Men centenarians
Politicians from Madurai
Tamil Nadu politicians